The 35th Golden Bell Awards (Mandarin:第35屆金鐘獎) was held on October 6, 2000 at the Sun Yat-sen Memorial Hall, Taipei, Taiwan. The ceremony was broadcast live by Formosa Television.

Winners and nominees
Below is the list of winners and nominees for the main categories.

References

2000
2000 television awards
2000 in Taiwan